The AK-726 (abbr. of ) is a twin  naval gun, which was developed in the Soviet Union and is still in service in various navies.

History
In 1954 the Soviet Union began development of a naval gun which could be used against both air and sea targets. The gun was developed by the development office  (later Arsenal Design Bureau) under the direction of Pyotr Tyurin. The first tests began in 1958. From 1960, the guns were begun to be installed on ships and tested. In 1962 the first gun was installed on the  cruiser. A second was installed on the  destroyer. The system was officially launched on June 24, 1964. The guns were exported to various Eastern Bloc states over time.

Construction
The gun has two barrels of  caliber. The projectiles are hand-loaded into an elevator from the ammunition chamber to the gun. The weapon has an automatic charging system. Both barrels fire simultaneously. This would achieve a theoretical rate of fire of about 100 rounds per minute, but is unsustainable. The barrels must be cooled a few minutes after 40 to 45 rounds of continuous fire. The cooling system is connected to the vessel's main water line.

The fire control is carried out either automatically via a fire-control radar type  Turel (NATO code: Hawk Screech), semi-automatically with the Prisma optical sight, or manually. The gun can be used against air, sea or land targets. There are two different types of high-explosive ammunition available; contact and proximity fuzes.

Platforms

References

Naval guns of the Soviet Union
Naval anti-aircraft guns